Levan Songulashvili (born August 17, 1991) is a Georgian-born New York-based visual artist; painter, draughtsman, installation and multimedia video artist.

Biography

Songulashvili was born in Tbilisi, on August 17, 1991.

In 2021, the Georgian National Museum presented Levan Songulashvili’s solo exhibition. In the same year the artist was named a Forbes Georgia 30 Under 30.

In 2011, the 19 years old artist was invited to Germany as part of the art project, where he designed a play along with his German counterparts.

At the age of 21, Songulashvili graduated from The Tbilisi State Academy of Arts with a bachelor's degree in Drawing and Printmaking. He won several merit scholarships and art prizes and became the first Georgian artist who earned his Master's (M.F.A.) degree with honors from The New York Academy of Art in Painting.

In 2018, Songulashvili had his extensive autonomous exhibition "The STYX" in two gallery spaces, curated by Mark Gisbourne. The show included a series of paintings and film installations devoted to the self-regenerative medusozoa jellyfish. In the second space there was another projected video three-wall environmental installation "The System of Objects", filmed in the Guggenheim Museum and newly completed Oculus in New York. The work also incorporated an extensive foreground receding sculptural component. The overall theme of the exhibition was that of "passage" and life journey, very much in line with philosopher-anthropologist Joseph Campbell’s famous historical anthropology of The Hero’s Journey, from life to death, ignorance to enlightenment, from day to night, and that of eternal return.
For Songulashvili this served as both a universal metaphor and creative theme, and also as an extended simile of the artist’s own evolving life experience.

In 2018, Songulashvili’s monumental stage installation "IDEM ET IDEM" was presented for composer Giya Kancheli’s historical concert with the world premiere of his latest musical piece for choir and chamber orchestra. Inspired by one of Songulashvili’s painting series the composer entitled his work with the same name.

The artist's works and multimedia installations are shown in art galleries, private collections, and museums worldwide, including Sotheby’s (NYC), The Royal Academy of Arts and  Saatchi Gallery. The artist's pieces are in the permanent collection of The Brooklyn Museum and on permanent view at The Rustaveli National Theatre.

Songulashvili has received the President’s Award and The New York State Assembly Award for Achievements and Contribution to the Arts.

Songulashvili also writes psychological prose, essays, verses and plays the piano.

Artistic practice
Levan Songulashvili explains his work by saying, "I care about the mysteries of Life, its origins, its endless cycles and regenerations and I question the current civilization in which we find ourselves and wonder: what will be the future of Humankind? What is problematic for scientists is fascinating for me. This process looks like a never-ending quest for an answer. In my view, an artist should be somewhat Don Quixot-ish. I am familiar with a state, after self-reflection an irrational impulse urges me to find water in a desert, which would then lead me to the ocean".

Stoicheîon 金星

In 2019, Songulashvili was artist in residence in Singapore, where he realized a multimedia solo project named Stoicheîon 金星. The show presented two monumental video installations and a selection of Japanese-ink paintings at the Objectifs - a centre for photography and film, Chapel Gallery.

The System of Objects

Bibliography
 Levan Songulashvili, Basak Senova: Triptychos, Window Project (2021), 
 Levan Songulashvili: ASSOCIO, Monograph (2020),  
 Mark Gisbourne, Levan Songulashvili: The STYX, Erti (2018),

Awards and nominations

References

1991 births
Living people
Tbilisi State Academy of Arts alumni
New York Academy of Art alumni
Expatriates from Georgia (country) in the United States
Postmodern artists
Abstract painters
Male painters
21st-century painters from Georgia (country)